Bahaghari is a 1940 Filipino film directed by Don Dano. It stars Rosa Aguirre, Miguel Anzures and Narding Anzures.

External links
 

1940 films
Philippine drama films
Filipino-language films
Tagalog-language films
Philippine black-and-white films